Pretty Eccentric™ is a  British clothing retailer. 

The first store opened in Brighton's Lanes district in October 2009

Corporate History
Pretty Eccentric was founded in 2009 by Michelle Scott. Previously she had a career in buying and marketing at the Arcadia Group, Whistles and at The Body Shop where she was UK Product Director and USA Marketing Director (2003–2009) but had harboured a lifelong ambition to create her own brand.

Product
Pretty Eccentric designs distinctive clothing, handbags, accessories and fine fragrance.
Beaded dresses with bows, frills, lace and old-fashioned glamour that is the design handwriting. "Pretty Eccentric brings a shot of old-fashioned glamour.", Vogue, UK, 1 May 2011.

References

External links 
 Official Website

Clothing retailers of the United Kingdom